In grammar, an antecedent is an expression (word, phrase, clause, sentence, etc.) that gives its meaning to a proform (pronoun, pro-verb, pro-adverb, etc.). A proform takes its meaning 
from its antecedent; e.g., "John arrived late because traffic held him up." The pronoun him refers to and takes its meaning from John, so John is the antecedent of him. Proforms usually follow their antecedents, but sometimes they precede them, in which case one is, technically, dealing with postcedents instead of antecedents. The prefix ante- means "before" or "in front of", and post- means "after" or "behind". The term antecedent stems from traditional grammar. The linguistic term that is closely related to antecedent and proform is anaphora. Theories of syntax explore the distinction between antecedents and postcedents in terms of binding.

Examples
Almost any syntactic category can serve as the antecedent to a proform. The following examples illustrate a range of proforms and their antecedents. The proforms are in bold, and their antecedents are underlined

a. Willy said he likes chocolate. - Noun as antecedent

b. My eccentric uncle likes chocolate. He tells everyone to buy him chocolate. - Noun phrase as antecedent

c. Larry was helpful, and so was Kim. - Adjective as antecedent

d. He arrived in the afternoon, when nobody was home. - Prepositional phrase as antecedent

e. Thomas plays soccer in the park. The kids all congregate there. - Prepositional phrase as antecedent

f. Our helpers did it very carefully, and we did it like that as well.  - Adverb phrase as antecedent

g. Fred works hard, but Tom does not do the same. - Verb phrase as antecedent

h. Susan lies all the time, which everybody knows about. - Entire clause as antecedent

i. Our politicians have been pandering again. This demotivates the voters. - Entire sentence as antecedent

j. Rob is a dentist and, as such, he fixes teeth. - Noun phrase as antecedent

k. Someone called who offered to help. She was really friendly. - Discontinuous word combination as antecedent

l. The paragraph has in fact been checked by Sam, but Susan won't do it. - Discontinuous word combination as antecedent

This list of proforms and the types of antecedents that they take is by no means exhaustive, but rather it is intended to merely deliver an impression of the breadth of expressions that can function as proforms and antecedents. While the stereotypical proform is a pronoun and the stereotypical antecedent a noun or noun phrase, these examples demonstrate that most any syntactic category can in fact serve as an antecedent to a proform, whereby the proforms themselves are a diverse bunch. The last two examples are particularly interesting, because they show that some proforms can even take discontinuous word combinations as antecedents, i.e. the antecedents are  constituents. A particularly frequent type of proform occurs in relative clauses. Many relative clauses contain a relative pronoun, and these relative pronouns have an antecedent. Sentences d and h above contain relative clauses; the proforms when and which are relative proforms.

Uncertain antecedents

In some cases, the wording could have an uncertain antecedent, where the antecedent of a pronoun is not clear because two or more prior nouns or phrases could match the count, gender, or logic as a prior reference.
In such cases, scholars have recommended to rewrite the sentence structure to be more specific, or repeat the words of the antecedent rather than use only a pronoun phrase, as a technique to resolve the uncertain antecedent.

For example, consider the sentence, "There was a doll inside the box, which was made of clay" where the word "which" could refer to either the box or the doll. To improve, the sentence could be reworded as: "Inside the box, there was a doll which was made of clay" or, "Inside the box, there was a doll made of clay" or, "There was a girl doll inside the box, and she was made of clay" (or similar wording).

Antecedents may also be unclear when they occur far from the noun or phrase they refer to. Bryan Garner calls these, "remote relatives", and gives this example from the New York Times:
and points out that "[t]hat modifies messages — 7 words and 3 nouns before." He also give examples for in which, who, and whose.

Postcedents

The ante- in antecedent means 'before, in front of'. Thus when a proform precedes its antecedent, the antecedent is technically not an antecedent, but rather it is a postcedent, post- meaning 'after, behind'. The following examples illustrate postcedents:

a. When it is ready, I'll have a cup of coffee. - Noun as postcedent

b. In her bed, my friend spends the entire morning. - Noun phrase as postcedent

c. It bothered me that she did not call. - Clause as postcedent, example of it-extraposition

d. Two violinists were there, at the party. - Prepositional phrase as postcedent

e. Sam tries to work then, when it is raining. - Clause as postcedent

Postcedents are rare compared to antecedents, and in practice, the distinction between antecedents and postcedents is often ignored, the term antecedent being used to denote both. This practice is a source of confusion and some have therefore denounced the term antecedent outright because of this confusion.

Implied antecedents
Some proforms lack a linguistic antecedent (or postcedent). In such cases, the antecedent is implied in the given discourse environment or from general knowledge of the world. For instance, the first person pronouns I, me, we, and us and second person pronoun you are proforms that usually lack a linguistic antecedent. However, their antecedents are present in the discourse context as the speaker and the listener. Pleonastic proforms also lack a linguistic antecedent, e.g. It is raining, where the pronoun it is semantically empty and cannot be viewed as referring to anything specific in the discourse world. Definite proforms such as they and you also have an indefinite use, which means they denote some person or people in general, e.g. They will get you for that, and therefore cannot be construed as taking a linguistic antecedent.

See also
 Binding — Association of anaphoric elements

Notes

References

 Carnie, A. 2013. Syntax: A generative introduction. 3rd edition. Malden, MA: Wiley-Blackwell.
 Crystal, D. 1997. A dictionary of linguistics and phonetics. 4th edition. Cambridge, MA: Blackwell Publishers.
 Radford, A. 2004. English syntax: An introduction. Cambridge: Cambridge University Press.
 Tesnière, L. 1969. Éléments de syntaxe structurale, 2nd edition. Klincksieck, Paris.

Semantics
Syntactic relationships
Syntax